The following is a list of 7400-series digital logic integrated circuits.  In the mid-1960s, the original 7400-series integrated circuits were introduced by Texas Instruments with the prefix "SN" to create the name SN74xx. Due to the popularity of these parts, other manufacturers released pin-to-pin compatible logic devices and kept the 7400 sequence number as an aid to identification of compatible parts.  However, other manufacturers use different prefixes and suffixes on their part numbers.

Overview

Some TTL logic parts were made with an extended military-specification temperature range. These parts are prefixed with 54 instead of 74 in the part number.

A short-lived 64 prefix on Texas Instruments parts indicated an industrial temperature range; this prefix had been dropped from the TI literature by 1973. Most recent 7400-series parts are fabricated in CMOS or BiCMOS technology rather than TTL.  Surface-mount parts with a single gate (often in a 5-pin or 6-pin package) are prefixed with 741G instead of 74.

Some manufacturers released some 4000-series equivalent CMOS circuits with a 74 prefix, for example, the 74HC4066 was a replacement for the 4066 with slightly different electrical characteristics (different power-supply voltage ratings, higher frequency capabilities, lower "on" resistances in analog switches, etc.). See List of 4000-series integrated circuits.
Conversely, the 4000-series has "borrowed" from the 7400 series such as the CD40193 and CD40161 being pin-for-pin functional replacements for 74C193 and 74C161.

Older TTL parts made by manufacturers such as Signetics, Motorola, Mullard and Siemens may have different numeric prefix and numbering series entirely, such as in the European FJ family FJH101 is an 8-input NAND gate like a 7430.

A few alphabetic characters to designate a specific logic subfamily may immediately follow the 74 or 54 in the part number, e.g., 74LS74 for low-power Schottky. Some CMOS parts such as 74HCT74 for high-speed CMOS with TTL-compatible input thresholds are functionally similar to the TTL part. Not all functions are available in all families.
The generic descriptive feature of these alphabetic characters was diluted by various companies participating in the market at its peak and are not always consistent especially with more recent offerings. The National Semiconductor trademarks of the words FAST and FACT are usually cited in the descriptions from other companies when describing their own unique designations.

In a few instances, such as the 7478 and 74107, the same suffix in different families do not have completely equivalent logic functions.

Another extension to the series is the 7416xxx variant, representing mostly the 16-bit-wide counterpart of otherwise 8-bit-wide "base" chips with the same three ending digits. Thus e.g. a "7416373" would be the 16-bit-wide equivalent of a "74373". Some 7416xxx parts, however, do not have a direct counterpart from the standard 74xxx range but deliver new functionality instead, which needs making use of the 7416xxx series' higher pin count. For more details, refer primarily to the Texas Instruments documentation mentioned in the References section.

For CMOS (AC, HC, etc.) subfamilies, read "open drain" for "open collector" in the table below.

There are a few numeric suffixes that have multiple conflicting assignments, such as the 74453.

Logic gates

Since there are numerous 7400-series parts, the following groups related parts to make it easier to pick a useful part number. This section only includes combinational logic gates.

For part numbers in this section, "x" is the 7400-series logic family, such as LS, ALS, HCT, AHCT, HC, AHC, LVC, ...

Normal inputs / push–pull outputs
{| class="wikitable"
|-
! Configuration !! Buffer !! Inverter
|-
| Hex 1-input || 74x34 || 74x04
|}
{| class="wikitable"
|-
! Configuration !! AND !! NAND !! OR !! NOR !! XOR !! XNOR
|-
| Quad 2-input || 74x08 || 74x00 || 74x32 || 74x02 || 74x86 || 74x7266
|-
| Triple 3-Input || 74x11 || 74x10 || 74x4075 || 74x27 || style="background: grey; text-align: center;" | n/a || style="background: grey; text-align: center;" | n/a
|-
| Dual 4-input || 74x21 || 74x20 || 74x4072 || 74x29 || style="background: grey; text-align: center;" | n/a || style="background: grey; text-align: center;" | n/a
|-
| Single 8-input || style="background: grey; text-align: center;" | n/a || 74x30 || 74x4078 || 74x4078 || style="background: grey; text-align: center;" | n/a || style="background: grey; text-align: center;" | n/a
|}

Schmitt-trigger inputs / push–pull outputs
{| class="wikitable"
|-
! Configuration !! Buffer !! Inverter
|-
| Hex 1-input || 74x7014 || 74x14
|}
{| class="wikitable"
|-
! Configuration !! AND !! NAND !! OR !! NOR
|-
| Quad 2-input || 74x7001 || 74x132 || 74x7032 || 74x7002
|-
| Dual 4-input || style="background: grey; text-align: center;" | n/a || 74x13 || style="background: grey; text-align: center;" | n/a || style="background: grey; text-align: center;" | n/a
|}

Normal inputs / open-collector outputs
{| class="wikitable"
|-
! Configuration !! Buffer !! Inverter
|-
| Hex 1-input || 74x07 || 74x05
|}
{| class="wikitable"
|-
! Configuration !! AND !! NAND !! OR !! NOR !! XOR !! XNOR
|-
| Quad 2-input || 74x09 || 74x03 || style="background: grey; text-align: center;" | n/a || 74x33 || 74x136 || 74x266
|-
| Triple 3-input || 74x15 || 74x12 || style="background: grey; text-align: center;" | n/a || style="background: grey; text-align: center;" | n/a || style="background: grey; text-align: center;" | n/a || style="background: grey; text-align: center;" | n/a
|-
| Dual 4-input || style="background: grey; text-align: center;" | n/a || 74x22 || style="background: grey; text-align: center;" | n/a || style="background: grey; text-align: center;" | n/a || style="background: grey; text-align: center;" | n/a || style="background: grey; text-align: center;" | n/a
|}

Schmitt-trigger inputs / three-state outputs
{| class="wikitable"
|-
! Configuration !! Buffer
!Inverter
|-
| Octal 1-input || 74x24174x244
| 74x240
|}

AND-OR-invert (AOI) logic gates
 NOTE: in past decades, a number of AND-OR-invert (AOI) parts were available in 7400 TTL families, but currently most are obsolete.
 SN5450 = dual 2-2 AOI gate, one is expandable (SN54 is military version of SN74)
 SN74LS51 = 2-2 AOI gate and 3-3 AOI gate
 SN54LS54 = single 2-3-3-2 AOI gate

Larger footprints
Parts in this section have a pin count of 14 pins or more.  The lower part numbers were established in the 1960s and 1970s, then higher part numbers were added incrementally over decades.  IC manufacturers continue to make a core subset of this group, but many of these part numbers are considered obsolete and no longer manufactured.  Older discontinued parts may be available from a limited number of sellers as new old stock (NOS), though some are much harder to find.

For the following table:
 Part number column the "x" is a place holder for the logic subfamily name. For example, 74x00 in "LS" logic family would be "74LS00".
 Description column the terms Schmitt trigger, open-collector/open-drain, three-state were moved to the input and output columns to make it easier to sort by those features.
 Input column a blank cell means a normal input for the logic family type.
 Output column a blank cell means a "totem pole" output, also known as a push–pull output, with the ability to drive ten standard inputs of the same logic subfamily (fan-out NO = 10). Outputs with higher output currents are often called drivers or buffers.
 Pins column number of pins for the dual in-line package (DIP) version; a number in parentheses (round brackets) indicates that there is no known dual in-line package version of this IC.

Smaller footprints
As board designs have migrated away from large amounts of logic chips, so has the need for many of the same gate in one package.  Since about 1996, there has been an ongoing trend towards one / two / three logic gates per chip. Now logic can be placed where it is physically needed on a board, instead of running long signal traces to a full-size logic chip that has many of the same gate.

All chips in the following sections are available 5- to 10-pin surface-mount packages. The right digits, after the 1G/2G/3G, typically has the same functional features as older legacy chips, except for the multifunctional chips and 4-digit chip numbers, which are unique to these newer families. The "x" in the part number is a place holder for the logic family name. For example, 74x1G14 in "LVC" logic family would be "74LVC1G14". The previously stated prefixes of "SN-" and "MC-" are used to denote manufacturers, Texas Instruments and ON Semiconductor respectively.

Some of the manufacturers that make these smaller IC chips are: Diodes Incorporated, Nexperia (NXP Semiconductors), ON Semiconductor (Fairchild Semiconductor), Texas Instruments (National Semiconductor), Toshiba.

The logic families available in small footprints are: AHC, AHCT, AUC, AUP, AXP, HC, HCT, LVC, VHC, NC7S, NC7ST, NC7SU, NC7SV. The LVC family is very popular in small footprints because it supports the most common logic voltages of 1.8 V, 3.3 V, 5 V, its inputs are 5 V tolerant when the device is powered at a lower voltage, and an output drive of 24 mA. Gates that are commonly available across most small footprint families are 00, 02, 04, 08, 14, 32, 86, 125, 126.

One-gate chips
All chips in this section have one gate, noted by the "1G" in the part numbers.

Two-gate chips
All chips in this section have two gates, noted by the "2G" in the part numbers.

Three-gate chips
All chips in this section have three gates, noted by the "3G" in the part numbers.

Voltage translation
All chips in this section have two power-supply pins to translate unidirectional logic signals between two different logic voltages. The logic families that support dual-supply voltage translation are AVC, AVCH, AXC, AXCH, AXP, LVC, where the "H" in AVCH and AXCH means "bus hold" feature.

Chips in the above table support the following voltage ranges on either power supply pin:
 AXC = 0.65 to 3.6 V. Only available from Texas Instruments.
 AXP = 0.9 to 5.5 V. Only available from Nexperia.
 LVC = 1.65 to 5.5 V. Available from Diodes Inc, Nexperia, Texas Instruments.

See also
 4000-series integrated circuits
 List of 4000-series integrated circuits
 Push–pull output, Open-collector output, Three-state output
 Schmitt trigger input
 Logic gate, Logic family
 Programmable logic device
 Pin compatibility

References

Further reading

 Digital Integrated Circuits, National Semiconductor Corporation, January 1974
 Logic/Memories/Interface/Analog/Microprocessor/Military Data Manual, Signetics Corporation, 1976
 The Bipolar Microcomputer Components Data Book for Design Engineers, Second Edition, Texas Instruments, 1979
 The TTL Data Book for Design Engineers, Second Edition, Texas Instruments, 1976
 Bipolar LSI 1982 Databook, Monolithic Memories Incorporated, September 1981
 Schottky TTL Data, DL121R1 Series D Third Printing, Motorola, 1983
 High-Speed CMOS Logic Data Book, Texas Instruments, 1984
 Logic: Overview, Texas Instruments Incorporated
 ALVC Advanced Low-Voltage CMOS Including SSTL, HSTL, And ALB (Rev. B), Texas Instruments, 2002
 IC Master, 1976
 Schottky and Low-Power Schottky Data Book, Advanced Micro Devices, July 1978

7400
Electronic design
Electronics lists
7400